In enzymology, a glucosyl-DNA beta-glucosyltransferase is an enzyme that catalyzes the chemical reaction in which a beta-D-glucosyl residue is transferred from UDP-glucose to a glucosylhydroxymethylcytosine residue in DNA.  This enzyme resembles DNA beta-glucosyltransferase in that respect.

This enzyme belongs to the family of glycosyltransferases, specifically the hexosyltransferases. The systematic name of this enzyme class is UDP-glucose:D-glucosyl-DNA beta-D-glucosyltransferase. Other names in common use include T6-glucosyl-HMC-beta-glucosyl transferase, T6-beta-glucosyl transferase, uridine diphosphoglucose-glucosyldeoxyribonucleate, and beta-glucosyltransferase.

References

 
 

EC 2.4.1
Enzymes of unknown structure
Viral enzymes